Elachista exaula is a moth in the family Elachistidae. It was described by Edward Meyrick in 1889. It is found in New Zealand.

The wingspan is 9–10 mm. The forewings are pale whitish-ochreous, irrorated with grey, more closely and suffusedly on the costa and more yellowish-tinged in the disc. There is a slender black median streak from near the base to before the middle and a black elongate dot in the disc above the middle, and a second, larger and more distinctly elongate, below it. There is also a slender black median streak from two-thirds to near the apex. The hindwings are grey.

References

Moths described in 1889
exaula
Moths of New Zealand
Endemic fauna of New Zealand
Taxa named by Edward Meyrick
Endemic moths of New Zealand